The 6th Circuit de Cadours was a non-championship Formula One motor race held on 12 September 1954 at the Circuit de Cadours, in Cadours, Tarn-et-Garonne, France. The race, consisting of 2x15 lap heats and a 30 lap final, was won by Jean Behra in a Gordini. Behra's team-mate André Pilette finished second and Louis Rosier in a Maserati was third. Behra and Pilette set joint fastest lap.

Classification

Race

References

Cadours
Cadours